Ayan Broomfield (born August 13, 1997) is a Canadian tennis player.

Broomfield has won two doubles title on the ITF tour in  her career. On April 27, 2015, she reached her best singles ranking of world number 680. On May 4, 2015, she peaked at world number 467 in the doubles rankings.

Broomfield made her WTA Tour debut at the 2014 Coupe Banque Nationale, having received a wildcard with Maria Patrascu into the doubles tournament. She decided to follow the college route and was part of the Clemson University tennis team from January 2016 to May 2017.

On May 25, 2019, playing for the UCLA Bruins, she and teammate Gabby Andrews won the doubles event at the 2019 NCAA Division I Women's Tennis Championship, defeating Kate Fahey and Brienne Minor of the Michigan Wolverines.

A short documentary titled Ayan Broomfield Tennis Story premiered on Amazon Prime Video on July 22, 2019. She was body double for select scenes of Venus Williams matches on the 2021 biographical film King Richard.

ITF Circuit finals

Doubles: 2 (2 titles)

References

External links
 
 
 
 UCLA Bruins profile
 Ayan Broomfield Documentary Short
 

1997 births
Living people
Canadian female tennis players
Tennis players from Toronto
Clemson Tigers women's tennis players
UCLA Bruins women's tennis players